Gideon Mensah (born 18 July 1998) is a Ghanaian professional footballer who plays as a left-back for French  club Auxerre. He represents the Ghana national team.

Club career

Red Bull Salzburg
In January 2019, Mensah joined Sturm Graz on loan until the end of the season. On 29 August 2019, he was then loaned out to Belgian club Zulte Waregem for the 2019–20 season.

Loan to Bordeaux 
On 3 August 2021, Mensah joined Bordeaux on a season-long loan with an option to buy until the end of the 2021–22 Ligue 1 season.

Auxerre
On 12 August 2022, Mensah signed a three-year contract with Auxerre.

International career 
Mensah made his debut for the Ghana national team in the 2021 AFCON qualifier against south Africa in 2019

He was part of the Ghana national team in the 2021 Africa Cup of Nations that was eliminated at the group stage of the competition.

References

External links
 
 
 

1998 births
Living people
Ghanaian footballers
Association football defenders
Ghana international footballers
Ghanaian expatriate footballers
Ghanaian expatriate sportspeople in Austria
Ghanaian expatriate sportspeople in Belgium
Ghanaian expatriate sportspeople in Portugal
Ghanaian expatriate sportspeople in France
Expatriate footballers in Austria
Expatriate footballers in Belgium
Expatriate footballers in Portugal
Expatriate footballers in France
FC Liefering players
SK Sturm Graz players
S.V. Zulte Waregem players
Vitória S.C. players
FC Girondins de Bordeaux players
AJ Auxerre players
2. Liga (Austria) players
Austrian Football Bundesliga players
Belgian Pro League players
Primeira Liga players
Ligue 1 players
2022 FIFA World Cup players